Fluctuodon is an extinct genus of kuehneotheriid mammaliaforms from the Late Triassic of France. Its type and only known species is Fluctuodon necmergor. Fluctuodon is known solely from molar teeth, which are distinguished from those of its close relative Kuehneotherium by their less acutely angled cusps.

References

Prehistoric mammaliaforms
Prehistoric cynodont genera
Late Triassic synapsids of Europe
Triassic France
Fossil taxa described in 2017